Vincent Gray may refer to:

 Vincent C. Gray (born 1942), American politician and former mayor of Washington, D.C.
 Vincent R. Gray (1922–2018), New Zealand global warming denier

See also
Vincent Grey